Salkhan Murmu is a socio-political activist.  He is the founder and national president of Jharkhand Disom Party. He was twice the Member of Parliament in 12th and 13th Lok Sabha from Mayurbhanj constituency in Odisha during the Atal Bihari Vajpayee Govt.

References 

Year of birth missing (living people)
Living people
Bharatiya Janata Party politicians from Odisha
Lok Sabha members from Odisha
India MPs 1998–1999
India MPs 1999–2004
People from Mayurbhanj district
People from East Singhbhum district
Janata Dal (United) politicians